Sandra Dallas is an American author of fiction, young adult fiction novels, children's fiction books, and nonfiction books. Prior to her career as an independent author, she was a reporter and bureau chief for BusinessWeek magazine for the Denver region. She is a 2003 recipient of the Spur Award for Best Western Novel and a 2008 recipient of the Spur Award for Best Western Short Novel.

Biography
Dallas received a degree in journalism from the University of Denver.  She was a reporter for BusinessWeek for 25 years, and was the magazine's first female bureau chief.  She began writing in the 1970s during her time as a reporter.  She lives in Denver with her husband Bob and has two grown daughters.

Awards & honors
 New York Times best-seller list for Prayers for Sale and True Sisters
 Independent Book Publishers Association's Benjamin Franklin Award for The Quilt that Walked to Golden
 National Cowboy Hall of Fame Western Heritage Wrangler Award for Sacred Paint
 "A quintessential American voice" - Jane Smiley, Vogue
 Spur Award for Best Western Novel, 2003
 Spur Award for Best Western Short Novel, 2008

Works

Novels
Little Souls (April 2022)
Westering Women (January 2020)
The Patchwork Bride (June 2018)
The Last Midwife (September 2015)
A Quilt for Christmas (October 2014)
Fallen Women (October 2013)
True Sisters (April 2012)
The Bride's House (May 2011)
Whiter Than Snow (March 2010)
Prayers for Sale (April 2009)
Tallgrass (February 2008)
New Mercies (February 2006)
The Chili Queen (February 2003)
Alice's Tulips (October 2000)
The Diary of Mattie Spenser (May 1998)
Prayers for Sale (April 1997)
The Persian Pickle Club (October 1995)
Buster Midnight's Cafe (April 1990)

Children's/Young Adult Novels
Someplace to Call Home (August 2019)
Hardscrabble (March 2018)
Red Berries, White Clouds, Blue Sky (September 2014)
The Quilt Walk (September 2012)

Non-Fiction
The Quilt That Walked to Golden (September 2007)
Colorado's Homes (October 1986)
Colorado Ghost Towns and Mining Camps (March 1985)
Sacred Paint: Ned Jacob (January 1979)
Yesterday's Denver (December 1973)
Cherry Creek Gothic: Victorian Architecture in Denver (May 1971)
Gaslights and Gingerbread (January 1965)
No More Than Five in a Bed: Colorado Hotels in the Old Days (July 1962)

References

External links
 Official website

American women writers
Living people
Year of birth missing (living people)
21st-century American women